Jesse Howard Swick (August 6, 1879 – November 17, 1952) was a Republican member of the U.S. House of Representatives from Pennsylvania.

J. Howard Swick was born near New Brighton, Pennsylvania. He attended Geneva College in nearby Beaver Falls, where he taught from 1895 to 1900. He graduated from Hahnemann Medical College of Philadelphia in 1900. He moved to Beaver Falls in 1906 and commenced the practice of medicine.

He served as president of the Beaver Falls Bureau of Health from 1907 to 1914. During the First World War, Swick served as a first lieutenant and later as a captain in the Medical Corps of the United States Army, with overseas service, from August 31, 1917 to May 9, 1919.

After his time in the service, he resumed the practice of medicine in Beaver Falls. He was also interested in banking and the manufacturing of steel products. He served as a member of the Beaver Falls City Council from 1925 to 1927.

Swick was elected as a Republican to the Seventieth and to the three succeeding Congresses. He was an unsuccessful candidate for reelection in 1934. He resumed the practice of medicine until August 1945, when he retired.

He died in Beaver Falls, aged 73, and is buried in Concord Cemetery in North Sewickley Township, Beaver County, Pennsylvania.

References
 Retrieved on 2008-02-10
The Political Graveyard

External links

1879 births
1952 deaths
United States Army personnel of World War I
People from Beaver Falls, Pennsylvania
United States Army Medical Corps officers
Geneva College alumni
Pennsylvania city council members
Drexel University alumni
Republican Party members of the United States House of Representatives from Pennsylvania